Panagiotis Markouizos (born August 13, 1980 in Athens) is a Greek figure skater. He is a multiple Greek national champion. His highest placement at an ISU championship was 33rd at the 2001 European Figure Skating Championships.

Career
Markouizos began skating in 1988 because his sister was. He won the Greek Figure Skating Championships between 1998 and 2003 and competed in the World Figure Skating Championships and European Figure Skating Championships. He stopped competing in 2004.
He is the first Greek skater to perform a triple  toe loop jump and a triple salchow jump in competition.

Markouizos has worked as a coach in Canada and in Greece.

Competitive highlights

 QR = Qualifying round; J = Junior level

References

External links

 
 Planéte Patinage
 Panagiotis Markouizos' website

Greek male single skaters
1980 births
Sportspeople from Athens
Living people